Greek grammar may refer to:
Ancient Greek grammar 
Koine Greek grammar
Modern Greek grammar